The 2004 Bulgarian Cup Final was played at the Vasil Levski National Stadium in Sofia on 12 May 2004 and was contested between the sides of Litex Lovech and CSKA Sofia. The match was won by Litex Lovech.

Match

Details

References

See also
2003–04 A Group

Bulgarian Cup finals
Cup Final
PFC Litex Lovech matches
PFC CSKA Sofia matches
Bulgarian Cup Final 2004